Hal Uderitz (born September 16, 1999) is an American soccer player who plays as a midfielder for MLS Next Pro club Tacoma Defiance.

Career

Youth
Uderitz was born in Kansas City, Missouri, but grew up in Snohomish, Washington, where he attended Snohomish High School and helped Snohomish win the 2015 state title. He also played club soccer for Crossfire Premier, been part of the team that got to the final eight in the USSDA playoffs in 2017.

College 
In 2018, Uderitz attended Seattle University to play college soccer. In four seasons with the Redhawks, Uderitz made 69 appearances, scoring 13 goals and tallying eight assists. He earned honors including WAC All-Freshman Team in 2018, and WAC All-Tournament Team and All-Far West Region Second Team in 2021.

While at college, Uderitz also played with Crossfire Redmond in the National Premier Soccer League during their 2019 season.

Professional
On January 11, 2022, Uderitz was selected 76th overall in the 2022 MLS SuperDraft by Seattle Sounders FC. On March 18, 2022, it was announced that Uderitz had signed with Seattle's MLS Next Pro side Tacoma Defiance ahead of their 2022 season. During the 2022 season, he made 19 appearances and scored two goals.

References

1999 births
Living people
American soccer players
Association football midfielders
MLS Next Pro players
National Premier Soccer League players
People from Snohomish, Washington
Seattle Redhawks men's soccer players
Seattle Sounders FC draft picks
Soccer players from Washington (state)